Abu al-Walid al-Baji (or Sulayman ibn Khalaf ibn Sa`d or  Sa`dun ibn Ayyub, al-Qadi Abu al-Walid al-Tujaybi al-Andalusi al-Qurtubi al-Baji al-Tamimi al-Dhahabi al-Maliki) (c. 1013–c. 1081) was a famous Maliki scholar and poet from Beja, Al-Andalus.

Al-Baji worked at various times as a watchman and a goldsmith to support himself. He was a contemporary of the jurist Ibn Hazm. He died in 1081.

Bibliography
By Abu al-Walid al-Baji:
 Al-Tasdid ila Ma`rifa al-Tawhid
 Sunan al-Minhaj
Tartib al-Hajj
Ihkam al-Fusul fi Ahkam al-Usul
al-Ta`dil wa al-Tajrih li man Kharraja `anhu al-Bukhari fi al-Sahih
Sharh al-Muwatta' in two versions: al-Istifa' and its abridgment al-MuntaqaSunan al-SalihinTahqiq al-madhhab''. Ed. Abu Abd al-Rahman Ibn Aqil al-Zahiri. Riyadh: 1983.

See also

 List of Ash'aris and Maturidis
 List of Muslim theologians

References

External links
  Sunnah.org ABU AL-WALID AL-BAJI, by Dr. G. F. Haddad
  Another biography of Imam Abul Walid Al Baji

1010s births
1081 deaths
11th-century Arabs
Asharis
Maliki scholars from al-Andalus
11th-century writers from al-Andalus
People from Beja, Portugal
11th-century jurists
11th-century Muslim theologians